The Anomalepididae are a family of nonvenomous snakes, native to Central and South America. They are similar to Typhlopidae, except that some species possess a single tooth in the lower jaw. Currently, four genera and 15 species are recognized. Common names include primitive blind snake and dawn blind snake.

Description
They are mainly burrowing snakes, and due to their life style their eyes are vestigial.

Geographic range
The family Anomalepididae is found from Southern Central America to northwestern South America. Disjunct populations occur in northeastern and southeastern South America.

Genera

T) Type genus.

References

External links

 
Snake families
Taxa named by Edward Harrison Taylor